Bigorna (anvil in Portuguese) was a Brazilian website about comics with an almost exclusive focus on Brazilian comics.

History 

It was created in 2005 by editor Eloyr Pacheco, who after a few years left the site, transferring the position of editor-in-chief to cartoonist Marcio Baraldi, who kept the site in operation until May 29, 2011, having published a text by farewell in which he informed that the site would remain online, even without updates, due to the six years of content focused on Brazilian comics.

Awards 

In 2006, the Bigorna website won the Jayme Cortez Trophy, an award intended to reward great contributions to Brazilian comics. In 2009 and 2010, it won the Prêmio DB Artes for Best Fanzine Site.

Troféu Bigorna 

In addition to interviews, reports and reviews of national comics, the Bigorna website was also responsible for the Troféu Bigorna, held from 2008 to 2010. The award was organized by Marcio Baraldi, Eloyr Pacheco, Humberto Yashima and Matheus Moura. The trophy design, which featured the design of an "Anvil Man" (Bigorna means "anvil" in Portuguese), was developed by Baraldi (the character has been used as the website's "mascot" since then). The main feature of Troféu Bigorna was its unique and exclusive focus on Brazilian artists.

Editions and winners

First Troféu Bigorna 
The first Troféu Bigorna's ceremony was held on November 29, 2008, at Blackmore Bar and awarded the following categories:

 Best Penciller: Samicler Gonçalves
 Best Writer: Francinildo Sena
 Best Political Cartoonist: Carlos Latuff
 Best Editorial Cartoonist: Luís Augusto Gouveia
 Best Author's Website: GrapHiQ Brasil (Mário Latino)
 Best Specialized Journalist: Gonçalo Júnior
 Best Publishing House: Desiderata
 Best Independent Publishing House: Júpiter II
 Best Fanzine / Independent Magazine: Café Espacial (Sergio Chaves)
 Best Humor Album/Book: Macambira e Sua Gente (Henrique Magalhães / Marca de Fantasia)
 Best Book About Comics: A Era de Bronze dos Super-Heróis (Roberto Guedes / HQM Editora)
 Best Adventure Book/Other: 35 Anos de Velta (Emir Ribeiro / independent)
 Contribution to Brazilian Comics Prize:Worney Almeida de Souza, for Prêmio Angelo Agostini's 24 yearsOpera Graphica publishing houseHQ Além dos Balões TV show
 "A Life Dedicated to Comics" Prize:Eugenio ColonneseGedeone MalagolaRodolfo Zalla
 Special Homage: Mark Novoselic

Second Troféu Bigorna 
The second Troféu Bigorna's ceremony was held on December 5, 2009, at the Blackmore Bar and awarded the following categories:

 Best Penciller: Luke Ross
 Best Writer: Alvimar Pires dos Anjos
 Best Political Cartoonist: Maurício Ricardo
 Best Editorial Cartoonist: Spacca
 Best Blog/Website About Comics: Zine Brasil (Michelle Ramos)
 Best Specialized Journalist: Marko Ajdarić
 Best Publishing House: Conrad Editora
 Best Independent Publishing House: Virgo
 Best Fanzine / Independent Magazine: Portal do Encantamento (José Pinto de Queiroz Filho)
 Best Humor Publication: Mad (many authors / Panini Comics)
 Best Book About Comics: Fantasma: a Biografia Oficial do Primeiro Herói Fantasiado dos Quadrinhos (Marco Aurelio Lucchetti / Opera Graphica)
 Best Adventure Book/Other: Artlectos e Pós-Humanos #3 (Edgar Franco / Marca de Fantasia)
 Contribution to Brazilian Comics Prize:Comix Book ShopHQ & Cia TV showQuarto Mundo art collective
 "A Life Dedicated to Comics" Prize:Rubens CordeiroDiamantino da SilvaAntônio Luiz CagninÁlvaro de Moya
 Special Homage: Senninha e Sua Turma (many authors / HQM Editora)

Third Troféu Bigorna 
The results of the award's third edition were announced on November 8, 2010. Exceptionally, there was no ceremony, and the trophies were sent directly to the winners. The following categories were awarded:
 Best Penciller: Elias Silveira
 Best Writer: Marcela Godoy
 Best Political Cartoonist: Amorim
 Best Editorial Cartoonist: Arionauro
 Best Blog/Website About Comics: JBlog Quadrinhos (Pedro de Luna)
 Best Specialized Journalist: Jota Silvestre
 Best Publishing House: Devir
 Best Independent Publishing House: Marca de Fantasia
 Best Fanzine / Independent Magazine: Maturi (GRUPEHQ)
 Best Humor Publication: Gibizon do Radicci (Iotti / independent)
 Best Book About Comics: Maria Erótica e o Clamor do Sexo (Gonçalo Júnior / Peixe Grande)
 Best Adventure Book/Other: Zoo (Nestablo Ramos Neto / HQM Editora)
 Contribution to Brazilian Comics Prize: Ota
 "A Life Dedicated to Comics" Prize:Osvaldo TaloJulio ShimamotoGetulio Delphim
 Special Homage:Joacy JamysGlauco

Notes

References

External links 

Brazilian news websites
Websites about comics
Comics awards in Brazil